The three-letter abbreviation RWS may stand for:

Businesses and organizations
Ravens Wood School, Keston, London Borough of Bromley, England
Royal Watercolour Society, an English institution of painters working in watercolours
Running with Scissors (company), a video game developer
RWS Group, Europe's largest patent translation and localisation services provider

Sports
RWS Bruxelles, a Belgian football club
RWS Motorsport, an auto racing team based in Anger, Bavaria, Germany

Weapons
6.5 X 68 RWS, a cartridge produced by Rheinisch-Westfälische Sprengstoffwerke for the Mauser 98 bolt-action rifle
Remote weapon station, a weapon mounting used on some armored military vehicles

Other uses
Audi R8 RWS, the rear wheel series of Audi R8 sports car
ISO 639:rws or Musi, a Malayan language
RESTful web service, appears in Whois-RWS, a type of Internet number lookup service
Resorts World Sentosa, an integrated resort in Singapore
Romano–Ward syndrome, a condition that causes a disruption of the heart's normal rhythm
Roulette wheel selection, a selection genetic operator in Genetic algorithms
Rider–Waite-Smith tarot deck